The Sabar people (also Shabar and Saora) are one of the Adivasi of Munda ethnic group tribe who live mainly in Odisha and West Bengal.  During the colonial period, they were classed as one of the 'criminal tribes' under Criminal Tribes Act 1871, and suffer from social stigma and ostracism in modern times.

Also known as Saora, the Sabar tribe finds mention in the Hindu epic Mahabharata, while in some parts of East Singhbhum district mainly in Musabani, they are known as in Kariya. Noted writer and activist Mahasweta Devi is known for working with these forest tribals.

This reclusive tribe is found primarily in Odisha and in Midnapore District of West Bengal.

The traditionally forest-dwelling tribe lack experience in agriculture, and rely on the forests for their livelihood. In recent years, with the spread of the Naxalite rebellion in the area, the police often restrict their access to the forest.  In 2004, five persons in the Sabar village of Amlasole, in Midnapore district, died after several months of starvation, 
 leading to a national media furore.  Subsequently, Durbar Mahila Samanway Committee (DMSC) started a school in the area, funded partially by sex workers from Kolkata.

In June 2008, the Sabar suffered severe flooding in many of their West Bengal villages, and then received large amounts of aid from Catholic missionaries.

Hundreds of Sabars migrated to present-day Bangladesh during the colonial period to work as tea garden labourers. Today, there are around 2000 of them residing the northeastern district of Moulvibazar, in areas such as Nandarani, Harinchhara and Rajghat.

References

Further reading
 The Book of the Hunter, by Mahasweta Devi, translated by Sagaree and Mandira Sengupta, Seagull, 2002. .
 Hated, Humiliated, Butchered by Mahasweta Devi, Tehelka, 12 October 2007
The Why-Why Girl, by Mahasweta Devi, illustrated by Kanyika Kini, Tulika Press, 2005. .

Sources 
 Sabar tribe in Sabar Nagar, Jamshedpur district

Social groups of Odisha
Social groups of West Bengal
Tribes of West Bengal
Ethnic groups in Odisha
Scheduled Tribes of India
Ethnic groups in Jharkhand
Hindu communities
Social groups of Jharkhand
Denotified tribes of India
People from Srimangal Upazila
People from Kamalganj Upazila
Ethnic groups in Bangladesh
Scheduled Tribes of Odisha